Avelino Vieira Airport  is the airport serving Arapoti, Brazil.

It is operated by the Municipality of Arapoti under the supervision of Aeroportos do Paraná (SEIL).

Airlines and destinations
No scheduled flights operate at this airport.

Access

See also

List of airports in Brazil

References

External links

Airports in Paraná (state)
Arapoti